Meloe violaceus, the violet oil beetle, is a species of oil beetle belonging to the family Meloidae subfamily Meloinae.

These beetles are present in most of Europe, in the eastern Palearctic realm, in the Near East, and in North Africa.

This species is characterized by hypermetamorphosis, a kind of complete insect metamorphosis in which, in addition to the normal stages of larva, nymph and imago, they have several others, with great differences in appearance and way of life.

These beetle are black-blue or violet-blue, head and pronotum are very finely dotted and the elytra are quite shorter than the abdomen, as in other Meloinae species.

The adults live on a sunny, dry area with flowering plants, feeding on pollen.

After about a month larvae emerge from eggs and climb up on grass or on flowers, waiting to cling to the thorax of approaching potential host insects seeking pollen or nectar.

The larvae have an exclusively parasitic life, primarily in the nests of solitary bees, or sometimes of locusts. If the larvae have inadvertently selected a honey bee, they die in the hive and may cause serious damage.

When the host female bee lays eggs in its cells, the first-stage larva of the violet oil beetle eats the eggs of the bee, increases in volume and becomes the second-stage larva, which continues its development eating honey and pollen. The larva, after other two stages, forms the nymph and finally the imago.

References

 Anderson, R., Nash, R. & O'Connor, J. P., 1997, Irish Coleoptera: a revised and annotated list, Irish Naturalists' Journal Special Entomological Supplement, 1–81
 Buck, F. D., 1954, Coleoptera: Lagriidae to Meloidae
 Bug Guide, Oil Beetles (Meloe)
 Buglife - The Invertebrate Conservation Trust, Join the Hunt for Amazing Oil Beetles
 Buglife - The Invertebrate Conservation Trust, Oil Beetle Life Cycle
 Funet
 Meloidae

External links
 Biolib
 Habitas
 Fauna Europaea

Meloidae
Beetles of Europe
Beetles described in 1802